Francesco Uberti (born 15 January 1962) is an Italian sprint canoer who competed in the mid-1980s. He won a bronze medal in the K-2 10000 m event at the 1985 ICF Canoe Sprint World Championships in Mechelen.

Uberti also competed at the 1984 Summer Olympics in Los Angeles, finishing fourth in the K-2 500 m and sixth in the K-2 1000 m events.

References

1962 births
Canoeists at the 1984 Summer Olympics
Italian male canoeists
Living people
Olympic canoeists of Italy
ICF Canoe Sprint World Championships medalists in kayak
20th-century Italian people